The 2011 Chang-Sat Bangkok Open was a professional tennis tournament played on hard courts. It was the third edition of the tournament which was part of the 2011 ATP Challenger Tour. It took place in Bangkok, Thailand between 29 August and 4 September 2011.

ATP entrants

Seeds

 1 Rankings are as of August 22, 2011.

Other entrants
The following players received wildcards into the singles main draw:
  Kong Pop Lertchai
  Kirati Siributwong
  Peerakiat Siriluethaiwattana
  Kittipong Wachiramanowong

The following players received entry from the qualifying draw:
  Érik Chvojka
  Riccardo Ghedin
  Gong Maoxin
  Li Zhe

Champions

Singles

 Cedrik-Marcel Stebe def.  Amir Weintraub, 7–5, 6–1

Doubles

 Pierre-Ludovic Duclos /  Riccardo Ghedin def.  Nicholas Monroe /  Ludovic Walter, 6–4, 6–4

External links
Official Website
ITF Search
ATP official site

 
 ATP Challenger Tour
Tennis, ATP Challenger Tour, Chang-Sat Bangkok Open
Tennis, ATP Challenger Tour, Chang-Sat Bangkok Open

Tennis, ATP Challenger Tour, Chang-Sat Bangkok Open
Tennis, ATP Challenger Tour, Chang-Sat Bangkok Open